Podocarpus madagascariensis is a species of conifer in the family Podocarpaceae. It is found only in Madagascar.

It is found in moist forests and shrublands in eastern and central Madagascar, from sea level up to 2,400 meters elevation. It occurs in the Madagascar lowland forests and montane Madagascar subhumid forests ecoregions, mostly in broadleaved evergreen forests. In the subhumid forests ecoregion, it is found in humid evergreen forest, montane sclerophyllous forest, and ridgetop shrublands. It is generally a canopy tree, and in the lowland forests it grow up to 20 to 25 meters high. On exposed ridges and high-elevation shrublands it forms a stunted tree or shrub.

References

madagascariensis
Least concern plants
Taxonomy articles created by Polbot
Endemic flora of Madagascar
Flora of the Madagascar subhumid forests
Flora of the Madagascar lowland forests